Adrian Sutil (born 11 January 1983) is a German-Uruguayan racing driver who raced in Formula One for seven seasons: from 2007–2011, then 2013–2014. He drove for the Spyker F1 Team, Force India F1 Team and the Sauber F1 Team.

Sutil started karting at the age of 14 and moved into single seater racing in 2002 in the Swiss Formula Ford series where he won the title. He moved up into Formula Masters Austria and started 1 race before stepping into Formula BMW ADAC in 2003. Sutil then raced in the Formula 3 Euroseries where he was the runner-up to Lewis Hamilton in 2005. He went to Japan in 2006 to race in the All-Japan Formula Three Championship and also finished 3rd in the Macau Grand Prix.

Having been involved in the Midland F1 test team, Sutil was promoted to a race seat for the new Spyker F1 team in 2007. Sutil continued to race with the team under their new guise Force India in 2008 where he remained until 2011. Having made his return to the sport in 2013 again with Force India, he competed in the 2014 season with the Sauber team.

Personal life
Born in Starnberg, West Germany, Sutil is the son of professional musicians Monika, a German, and Jorge, a Uruguayan. He has two brothers, named Daniel and Raphael.  He weighs 75 kilograms (165 pounds) and is 183 centimeters (6 feet) tall.  A talented pianist, Sutil speaks fluent German, English, and Spanish and a little Italian.

Shanghai nightclub incident and assault conviction
On the evening following the April 2011 , Sutil was involved in an incident with Genii Capital CEO and owner of the Lotus F1 team Eric Lux in a nightclub in Shanghai. Sutil struck Lux with a champagne glass, causing a wound in his neck which required 24 stitches. Sutil apologised for the incident, which he described as unintentional. Lux's lawyers filed a criminal complaint for physical assault and grievous bodily harm against Sutil. Force India owner Vijay Mallya refused to take action against Sutil until the case proceeded further, but on 16 December 2011 Force India announced they had opted not to renew Sutil's contract for 2012, and would field reserve driver Nico Hülkenberg alongside di Resta.

On 13 January 2012, German prosecutors announced that Sutil would stand trial over the incident, charged with assault occasioning grievous bodily harm. Sutil was convicted of the charge on 31 January 2012, and received an 18-month suspended prison sentence, along with a €200,000 fine that was to be donated to charities "of the court's choosing." Sutil initially had planned on appealing his conviction but eventually decided not to.

Lewis Hamilton, among Sutil's friends at the time, was also present in the nightclub that night. He was named as a defence witness by Sutil's side, but Hamilton did not appear in court because the trial coincided with the launch of his team's car. He stated he could attend a retrial, should one take place, as he would not be occupied on the scheduled day, but as a result, the friendship of the two drivers ended, with Sutil branding Hamilton a "coward."

Sutil remained without a seat throughout 2012.

Car collection 
Adrian Sutil is a prolific car collector, owning a large collection of significant and expensive cars. He has the largest car collection of any Formula 1 driver past or present.

Sutil's car collection includes:

 Koenigsegg One:1
 Koenigsegg Regera
 Pagani Zonda 760 Viola
 Pagani Huayra BC
 Ferrari Enzo
 Ferrari LaFerrari Aperta
 Ferrari Monza SP1
 Bugatti Veyron 16.4 Centenaire (1 of 4)
 Bugatti Veyron 16.4 Grand Sport "Soleil de Nuit"
 Bugatti Veyron 16.4 Grand Sport Vitesse Rembrandt Edition (1 of 3)
 Bugatti Veyron 16.4 Grand Sport Vitesse Black Bess (1 of 3)
 Bugatti Veyron 16.4 Super Sport
 Bugatti Chiron Sport 110 Ans
 Bugatti Chiron Pur Sport "Green Rhapsody"
 Mercedes Benz SLR McLaren Stirling Moss
 McLaren Senna LM

McLaren Senna LM crash
On 30 July 2020, Sutil crashed his McLaren Senna LM into an electricity pylon at the side of the road in Monaco after losing control of the car. Sutil's Senna – one of 35 Senna LM made – was heavily damaged; with its front bumper, front panels and bonnet detached from its chassis, with the windscreen shattered. Sutil emerged from the wreckage unscathed. Rather than being scrapped, Sutil's Senna LM was rebuilt. The process took over 2 years, with the rebuild process finishing in late December 2022.

Racing biography

Karting and Junior Formulae
Sutil started karting at 14 before moving up to Swiss Formula Ford 1800 in 2002. He won all ten rounds of the season from pole and added five wins in the Formula Masters Austria championship.

Formula BMW and Formula Three
When Sutil moved up to the Formula BMW ADAC championship in 2003 he finished in sixth place in the series, but with no wins. The following season he stepped up to the Formula 3 Euroseries with Colin Kolles' team. Although he scored only twice, the connection he made with Kolles would prove useful in the future. He moved to the ASM team at the final round of the year.

Sutil stayed with ASM for 2005 and was joined by British driver Lewis Hamilton. Hamilton won more races than Sutil, but the German was runner-up to Hamilton and the Briton's only serious competitor in the championship and at the Marlboro Masters of Formula Three at Zandvoort.

Sutil missed the last two rounds of the 2005 Euroseries after joining A1 Team Germany for the inaugural A1 Grand Prix series. He raced for them at three events in Portugal, Australia and Dubai, his best result being two twelfth places.

He spent 2006 racing in Japan and won the All-Japan Formula Three Championship. He showed a very strong performance all season. He also finished third in the Macau Formula Three Grand Prix and made a one-off appearance in Japanese Super GT.

Formula One

Midland (2006)

That year also saw Sutil enter Formula One. In January, he was confirmed as one of the three test drivers for the new Midland F1 Racing team, along with Markus Winkelhock and Giorgio Mondini. This came thanks to his connections with Colin Kolles, who was then running the team.

Sutil appeared for the team as the third driver at the European, French and Japanese Grands Prix. By the time of his third appearance, the outfit had been bought by Spyker Cars. At the end of the year, he was promoted to second driver for the 2007 season, having been signed on a multi-year contract by the Spyker MF1 Team. In an interview with the Official Formula One website, Sutil's first 2007 teammate, Christijan Albers, commented that "Adrian is a good driver and he will be quick this year, but as a driver you should always be pushing to the limits without thinking what the guy in the car next to you is doing. But Adrian will be a good team-mate and it looks as though he's going to be a big talent [for the future]".

Spyker (2007)

During 2007, Sutil out-qualified and out-raced his team-mate Albers at all Grands Prix before the Dutchman was replaced by Sutil's countryman Markus Winkelhock, test driver for the team up until that time at the European Grand Prix. Sutil out-qualified Winkelhock, although the latter went on to lead the race and restart after a sudden downpour. Winkelhock resumed his third driver role for the following grand prix at Hungary when Japanese driver Sakon Yamamoto took over the second team seat. Sutil out-performed Yamamoto in the race, passing Honda drivers Rubens Barrichello and Jenson Button.

In the Hungarian Grand Prix, Sutil was the first Spyker driver in 2007 to beat another running classified finisher, Honda's Rubens Barrichello.

For the Turkish Grand Prix, a B-spec car was expected for the Spyker team, but it failed a rear crash test and Sutil continued to use the older spec car. After fuel pressure problems, he was forced to start the race from the pits and finished five laps behind. At Monza, despite the introduction of the B-spec Spyker F8-VII and due to the nature of the circuit, the Spykers were largely uncompetitive once again and Sutil finished 19th, again only in front of his team-mate.

At the Belgian Grand Prix, the strengths of the B-spec car were fully evident with both Sutil and Yamamoto setting competitive times through the three practice sessions culminating in Sutil qualifying only half a second behind 16th placed man Vitantonio Liuzzi. During the race, Sutil passed the Toyota of Jarno Trulli, Hondas of Rubens Barrichello and Jenson Button as well as the Red Bull's David Coulthard, Toro Rosso's Vitantonio Liuzzi and Williams driver Alexander Wurz. He ran as high as 12th before finishing 14th. He was highly praised for his efforts by both team and media.

Two weeks later in the rain at Fuji Speedway, Japan, it seemed Sutil had narrowly missed an opportunity to score Spyker's first ever point, briefly holding 8th position on the penultimate lap of the high-attrition race after Nick Heidfeld retired his BMW, but was almost immediately passed by fellow backmarker Vitantonio Liuzzi in the Toro Rosso and finished 9th. After the race it was found that Liuzzi had overtaken Sutil under yellow flags, and the 25-second penalty for the Italian promoted Sutil to the final points position. Toro Rosso appealed the decision, but the penalty was upheld.

Spyker were not competitive in the final two races of the year, neither of which Sutil finished. He has been praised by many for his performances in the 2007 Formula One Championship. Despite driving the most uncompetitive car of the year, the German rookie impressed by not only dominating all of his teammates in both qualifying and race conditions, but also by challenging other drivers with superior equipment.

Force India (2008–2011, 2013)
2008

Sutil continued with the team in 2008 under its new identity as Force India, after briefly entertaining the possibility of a drive with McLaren or Williams. The first two races of the season ended with mechanical failures

While running in a very strong fourth position in Monaco with six laps remaining, he was hit in the rear by fifth placed Kimi Räikkönen who lost control of his car while braking for the harbour chicane. A crash a few laps earlier had resulted in the safety car being deployed, with Sutil losing his considerable lead over the Finnish driver. Sutil's car suffered damage to the rear diffuser, and he was forced to retire. Mike Gascoyne called for Räikkönen to be punished over the incident. No punishment, however, was given. However, Sutil had overtaken three cars under yellow flags and according to steward Paul Gutjahr, should he have reached the chequered flag, he would have been given a 25-second penalty which would have dropped him out of the point-scoring positions.

On 17 October Force India announced they would keep Sutil for the 2009 season.

2009
Sutil and the Force India team started the year with a real optimism of points scoring finishes when the European part of the season started after the first four races. BBC commentator Martin Brundle expressed his personal view that:

In Australia, after starting from 16th on the grid, Sutil progressed steadily through the field to finish just outside the points in 9th place. In Malaysia, he qualified 19th and finished 15th when the race was stopped on lap 33 due to torrential rain.

In China, Sutil was running in 6th place with 6 laps remaining when he lost control of his Force India – due to aquaplaning – resulting in him crashing and forcing him to retire.

In Bahrain, Sutil was penalised for blocking Mark Webber during the first qualifying session. He personally walked into Mark's room to apologise for the incident.

In Spain, after running wide at the first corner of the first lap Sutil rejoined the track only to hit the Toyota of Jarno Trulli. The Italian had also run wide and was rejoining the track.  This forced both drivers to retire and caused the two Toro Rossos of Sébastien Bourdais and Sébastien Buemi to crash into each other.

In Monaco, Sutil finished 14th and finished 17th in Turkey, after qualifying a career-best of 15th.

In qualifying in Britain, Sutil went off at Abbey corner after brake failure in Q1. Qualifying was red flagged and as a result no one else could post a lap time. This meant that Sutil was to start from 18th on the grid, although the team had hoped that both Sutil and Giancarlo Fisichella would get into Q2. Due to the damage caused by the accident he had to start from the pit lane because he needed to use a new car and a new engine, and went on to finish 17th in an uneventful race.

In Germany, Sutil took advantage of the unpredictable conditions in qualifying, and secured his best-ever qualifying position of seventh. In the race, he was lying in second place for a while before his first pit stop. However, a collision with Kimi Räikkönen after coming out of the pit lane meant he had to pit again to replace his front wing. He finished 15th. It was the second time that a collision with Räikkönen cost Sutil the chance to score points, after the previous incident at the 2008 Monaco Grand Prix.

In Hungary, he was forced to retire after just two laps because a water temperature problem caused the engine to overheat, after qualifying 17th.

In Valencia, new aerodynamic upgrades for the VJM02 saw him qualify 12th, and he then raced steadily to finish 10th, demonstrating that the team were at last showing signs of competitiveness, as teammate Fisichella finished 12th behind Heidfeld's BMW Sauber.

In Belgium, he qualified 11th, although the main celebrations in the Force India pit were for teammate Giancarlo Fisichella's excellent pole position. Sutil finished 11th, while Fisichella finished less than a second behind Kimi Räikkönen's race-winning Ferrari.

He also recorded the fastest lap of the race, his first in Formula One and the first fastest lap recorded for Force India. This finish would be the best of his F1 career.

In Singapore, Sutil was forced to retire after he collided with Nick Heidfeld of BMW Sauber, moving into his path as he recovered from a spin. After the race, Sutil was reprimanded by race stewards and fined $20,000 for causing an avoidable accident.

In Japan, Sutil took his second best career qualifying result of fourth, but was given a 5 grid place penalty along with Jenson Button, Rubens Barrichello and Fernando Alonso for not slowing down while yellow flags were waved (due to a crash by Sebastien Buemi, who was also demoted five places for attempting to drive his badly damaged Toro Rosso back to the pits) and started the race from eighth on the grid. Sutil finished 13th.

In the wet qualifying session in Brazil, Sutil qualified third, but retired on lap one following a collision with the Toyota of Jarno Trulli. Out of control on the wet grass outside Turn 5, Trulli hit Sutil, and then slid back onto the track and struck Alonso's Renault, resulting in all three being out of the race. Trulli blamed Sutil for pushing him outside the track at the fifth corner and thus causing the accident, and furiously berated the German at the side of the track in full-view of worldwide TV cameras. This time the stewards took no action against Sutil for the accident, while Trulli was fined $10,000 for his unacceptable behaviour.

In Abu Dhabi, Sutil was unusually off the pace, qualifying only 18th on the grid. Although he overtook several cars during the race, a poor pit strategy resulted in Sutil finishing the race at the back of the field, scrapping with Fisichella (who had joined Ferrari) and Renault's Romain Grosjean. The German eventually finished 17th, 1 lap down but ahead of the Frenchman.

2010

Sutil was in talks with Force India to renew his contract, and on 27 November 2009, the team announced that the German's contract had been renewed, while test-driver Vitantonio Liuzzi was given a full-time race seat. Sutil qualified tenth for the first two races of the year, but a collision with Robert Kubica in Bahrain and a mechanical failure in Australia meant he was unable to score points in either race. However, Sutil commented that the performances proved that the team could now score points in dry races. This comment was backed up by Sutil's fifth-place finish in the following race in Malaysia. In China he finished 11th. In Spain he finished 7th and in Monaco he finished 8th. Sutil again finished in the points in Turkey with a 9th place. He followed this result with points scoring finishes in the next three rounds in Canada, Europe and Britain.

2011

In the first three races of the season, Sutil was out-qualified by di Resta. In Malaysia, Sutil finished eleventh, just behind di Resta, and in China, he qualified eleventh. In Monaco, he had his best result of the season, finishing seventh. He retired in Canada after hitting a wall, which resulted in damage to his car's suspension. At his home race, Sutil took a season best finish of sixth place, after implementing a different strategy to some of the drivers around him on the grid, making just two pit stops to the three made by his rivals.

He retired at Monza after his car suffered a hydraulics problem, before an eighth-place finish in Singapore, holding off a late-race challenge from Felipe Massa. In Japan, Sutil ran inside the top ten placings for much of the race, but finished the race just outside the points in eleventh place, having been passed by Vitaly Petrov and Nico Rosberg in the closing stages of the race. Another eleventh place followed in Korea, before a ninth-place finish in the inaugural race in India. At the final race in Brazil, Sutil matched his best finish of the season with sixth place, and as a result, moved into ninth place in the final championship standings. As a result of his assault convictions (see above), Sutil was released at the end of the 2011 season and replaced with Nico Hülkenberg.

2013

On 28 February 2013, Force India announced that Sutil would return to the team to complete their driver lineup alongside Paul di Resta. He finished seventh at the season-opening , impressing on his comeback by leading for a number of laps throughout the race.

In Malaysia, he retired from the race following problems with a new captive wheel nut system that the team had introduced at the beginning of the season.

After two non-points finishes he showed a respectable performance at the Monaco Grand Prix by overtaking the world champions Fernando Alonso and Jenson Button to finally end up in 5th position.

Sauber (2014)

It was announced on 13 December 2013 that Sutil would join Sauber for 2014. For the first six races of the 2014 season Sutil struggled with a car which lacked pace and he also made a number of mistakes which lost him possible points finishes.

In November 2014, it was announced he would be dropped and replaced for the 2015 Formula One season.

Williams (2015)
Sutil joined Williams as a reserve driver prior to the 2015 Malaysian Grand Prix.

Racing record

Career summary

Complete Formula Three Euroseries results
(key) (Races in bold indicate pole position; races in italics indicate fastest lap)

Complete A1 Grand Prix results
(key) (Races in bold indicate pole position; races in italics indicate fastest lap)

Complete All-Japan Formula Three results
(key)

Complete Formula One results
(key) (Races in bold indicate pole position; races in italics indicate fastest lap)

 Driver failed to finish the race, but was classified as they had completed >90% of the race distance.

References

External links

 
 
 F1Fanatic.co.uk – Who's Who: Adrian Sutil

1983 births
Living people
People from Starnberg
Sportspeople from Upper Bavaria
German people of Uruguayan descent
German expatriate sportspeople in Japan
German expatriate sportspeople in Switzerland
Racing drivers from Bavaria
German racing drivers
German Formula One drivers
Spyker Formula One drivers
Force India Formula One drivers
Sauber Formula One drivers
Formula BMW ADAC drivers
Formula 3 Euro Series drivers
Japanese Formula 3 Championship drivers
Super GT drivers
A1 Team Germany drivers
Kolles Racing drivers
ART Grand Prix drivers
TOM'S drivers
A1 Grand Prix drivers
Super Nova Racing drivers
Ferrari Challenge drivers